Lyman F. Hoffman (born February 13, 1950) is a Yup'ik politician and registered Democrat who caucuses with the Republicans in the Alaska Senate. He represents the S district since 1995, and from 1991 through 1992 previously. He was a member of the Alaska House of Representatives from 1986 through 1990, and from 1993 through 1994.

In January 2019, Hoffman became the longest-serving member in the history of the Alaska Legislature, surpassing the tenure of Jay Kerttula, the previous record holder.

Republican affiliation
Hoffman is the only registered Democrat to caucus with the Republicans in the Senate. He endorsed Republican nominee Dan Sullivan over Senator Mark Begich during the 2014 U.S. Senate race.

Drunk driving and jail sentence
On May 1, 2004, Hoffman was arrested for erratic driving and for striking a home with his car. He refused to take a breathalyzer test and later pled guilty to the charges. He was sentenced to three days in jail by Judge Peter Froehlich, which began on July 6. Hoffman also had his driver's license revoked for 90 days, was placed on probation for one year, and was fined $1,500.

Ethics violations
Hoffman was found guilty of violating financial disclosure laws by the Senate Committee on Legislative Ethics. Hoffman hid about $500,000 in income from his business interests in a company that primarily contracts with a state-funded agency. From Alaska Public Media, "The committee found that Senator Hoffman "knowingly" prepared and filed incomplete disclosures, leaving out a "substantial" amount of income."

Alaska's fiscal crisis
Hoffman is the chair of the Senate Finance Committee, whose plan to address the fiscal crisis focuses on cutting services and capping the Permanent Fund Dividend. Critics note that the hardest hit areas from slashing the PFD are in Hoffman's district. The Senate Majority has failed to pass a plan to address the fiscal crisis since it began.

References

External links

 Alaska State Legislature – Senator Lyman Hoffman official AK Senate website
 Project Vote Smart – Representative Lyman F. Hoffman (AK) profile
 Follow the Money – Lyman F. Hoffman
 2006 2004 2002 1998 1994 1992 1990 campaign contributions
 Lyman Hoffman at 100 Years of Alaska's Legislature

1950 births
20th-century American politicians
21st-century American politicians
Alaska politicians convicted of crimes
Democratic Party Alaska state senators
American city managers
Living people
Democratic Party members of the Alaska House of Representatives
Native American state legislators in Alaska
People from Bethel, Alaska
Yupik people